Character or Characters may refer to:

Arts, entertainment, and media 

 Character (arts), a fictional being in a narrative

Literature
 Character (novel), a 1936 Dutch novel by Ferdinand Bordewijk
 Characters (Theophrastus), a classical Greek set of character sketches attributed to Theophrastus

Music
 Characters (John Abercrombie album), 1977
 Character (Dark Tranquillity album), 2005
 Character (Julia Kent album), 2013
 Character (Rachael Sage album), 2020
 Characters (Stevie Wonder album), 1987

Types of entity
 Character (arts), an agent within a work of art, including literature, drama, cinema, opera, etc.
 Character sketch or character, a literary description of a character type
 Game character (disambiguation), various types of characters in a video game or role playing game
 Player character, as above but who is controlled or whose actions are directly chosen by a player
 Non-player character, as above but not player-controlled, frequently abbreviated as NPC

Other uses in arts, entertainment, and media
 Character (film), a 1997 Dutch film based on Bordewijk's novel
 Charaktery, a monthly magazine in Poland
 Netflix Presents: The Characters, an improvised sketch comedy show on Netflix

Sciences 
 Character (biology), the abstraction of an observable physical or biochemical trait of an organism

Mathematics 
 Character (mathematics), a homomorphism from a group to a field
 Characterization (mathematics), the logical equivalency between objects of two different domains.
 Character theory, the mathematical theory of special kinds of characters associated to group representations
 Dirichlet character, a type of character in number theory
 Multiplicative character, a homomorphism from a group to the multiplicative subgroup of a field

Morality and social science
 Character education, a US term for values education
 Character structure, a person's traits
 Moral character, an evaluation of a particular individual's durable moral qualities

Symbols 
 Character (symbol), a sign or symbol
 Character (computing), a unit of information roughly corresponding to a grapheme

Other uses 
 Character (income tax), a type of income for tax purposes in the US
 Sacramental character, a Catholic teaching
 Neighbourhood character, the look and feel of a built environment

See also 
 
 
 Virtual character (disambiguation)